Ahtyba Rubin (born July 25, 1986) is a former American football defensive tackle. He was drafted by the Cleveland Browns in the sixth round of the 2008 NFL Draft. He played college football at Iowa State.

Early years
Born in Fort Belvoir, Virginia, Rubin graduated from Escambia High School in Pensacola, Florida in 2004, the same high school as former Cleveland Browns teammate Trent Richardson, and NFL Hall of Famer Emmitt Smith. He then went on to attend Trinity Valley Community College in Athens, Texas. In his freshman year, he played defensive line, but was converted into an offense lineman for his sophomore year. Rubin made the adjustment with significant success and earned all-conference and honorable mention All-America honors in 2006.

College career
Regarded as a three-star recruit out of junior college, Rubin was recruited by a number of schools, and eventually picked Iowa State over TCU. He was switched back to defensive line in his junior year, and started the last nine games of the 2006 season. He finished the year with 34 tackles, four tackles for loss, and a sack.

As a senior, Rubin played in all of the Cyclones' games, registering 42 tackles (with four for loss) and recording 1.5 sacks.

Professional career

2008 NFL Draft
Following his impressive senior season at Iowa State, Rubin was regarded as a "productive NFL starter" at nose tackle, and projected a mid-third round pick by Sports Illustrated.

Cleveland Browns
Rubin was selected in the sixth round (190th overall) by the Cleveland Browns, and was signed on July 22, 2008.

He filled out a backup role for Browns nose tackle Shaun Rogers in 2008 and 2009, until Rogers went down with a lower leg injury in week 12 against the Cincinnati Bengals. Rubin has since become the Browns starting nose tackle. In the 2010 offseason the Browns traded defensive end Corey Williams to the Detroit Lions, moved former starting nose Tackle Shaun Rogers to defensive end and promoted Rubin to starter due to his performance in 2009.  2010 was the best season of Rubin's young career, highlighted by his 87 tackles and an interception against Kansas City's Matt Cassel. In his five years with the Browns, Rubin has played in 72 games, starting 50 of them. His career totals are 9.0 sacks, 227 total tackles, 4 passes defended, 1 interception, 3 forced fumbles, and 1 fumble recovery.

Seattle Seahawks
On March 19, 2015 Rubin signed a one-year deal with the Seattle Seahawks. The Seahawks released incumbent starting defensive tackle Tony McDaniel during training camp, giving Rubin a great opportunity at a starting job. In Week 4 against the Cincinnati Bengals, Rubin got his first sack as a Seahawk. In Week 11 vs the Pittsburgh Steelers, Rubin got an interception in a 39-30 victory.

On March 7, 2016, he signed a three-year contract.

On September 2, 2017, Rubin was released by the Seahawks.

Denver Broncos
On September 15, 2017, Rubin signed with the Denver Broncos. He was released on October 17, 2017.

Atlanta Falcons
On October 19, 2017, Rubin signed with the Atlanta Falcons.

Oakland Raiders
On June 12, 2018, Rubin signed with the Oakland Raiders. He was placed on injured reserve on August 15, 2018 after suffering a tear in his biceps.

References

External links
Seattle Seahawks bio 
Cleveland Browns bio 
Iowa State Cyclones bio

1986 births
Living people
African-American players of American football
American football defensive tackles
Atlanta Falcons players
Cleveland Browns players
Denver Broncos players
Iowa State Cyclones football players
Oakland Raiders players
Players of American football from Virginia
Seattle Seahawks players
Sportspeople from Fairfax County, Virginia
Players of American football from Pensacola, Florida
Trinity Valley Cardinals football players
21st-century African-American sportspeople
20th-century African-American people